7D or 7-D may refer to:

7D (Argentina), a political scandal in Argentina
7D (Long Island bus)
The 7D, an animated series for Disney XD
7D, the production code for the 1987 Doctor Who serial Time and the Rani
Canon EOS 7D, a 2009 18-megapixel digital single-lens reflex camera
Canon EOS 7D Mark II, a 2014 20-megapixel digital single-lens reflex camera
Donbassaero IATA airline designator
Konica Minolta Maxxum 7D, a 2004 6.1-megapixel digital single-lens reflex camera
Oflag VII-D, a World War II German prisoner-of-war camp for officers
Seven-dimensional space
Sevendust, an alternative metal band based in Atlanta, Georgia, United States

See also
D7 (disambiguation)